AMF may refer to:
 
 Action Message Format, a protocol for object remoting
 Additive Manufacturing File Format, a protocol for 3D printing
 Adios Motherfucker, a cocktail
 Against Malaria Foundation, a charity that raises funds for mosquito bednets
 American Machine and Foundry, a recreational equipment supplier
 AMF Bowling
 Ameriflight, an airline with ICAO code AMF
 Amsterdam Music Festival, an EDM event originating in The Netherlands
 Ammanford railway station, National Rail code
 Arbuscular mycorrhizal fungi, a fungus symbiotic on vascular plant roots.
 Arab Monetary Fund
 Asociación Mundial de Fútbol de Salón (World Futsal Association), an international futsal governing body
 Association for the Protection of Mixed Families' Rights
 Autorité des marchés financiers (France), French financial regulatory agency
 Autorité des marchés financiers (Québec), Canadian province of Quebec financial regulatory agency
 Hollywood Bowl Group, bowling centre operator formerly known as AMF Bowling UK
 Ama Airport in Ama, Papua New Guinea, IATA code AMF